The 1920 Sunderland by-election was held on 24 April 1920.  The by-election was held due to the incumbent Coalition Liberal MP, Hamar Greenwood, being appointed Chief Secretary for Ireland.  It was retained by Greenwood.

References

1920 elections in the United Kingdom
1920 in England
April 1920 events
Politics of the City of Sunderland
By-elections to the Parliament of the United Kingdom in County Durham constituencies
Ministerial by-elections to the Parliament of the United Kingdom